Reda Mansour is an Israeli Druze poet, historian and diplomat. He has published three books of Hebrew poetry and received the University of Haifa Miller Award as well as the State President Scholarship for young writers.

Mansour was born (1965) in the Druze village of Isfiya in northern Israel. He has a Ph.D from the University of Haifa's Middle East History Department and a graduate of Harvard Kennedy Schoolm where he was a Wexner Israel Fellow.

He studied Spanish at Salamanca University, and a general studies semester in the Hebrew University in Jerusalem.

His field of research is the Changes in the Perception of Identity and Social Environment as Evident in the Intellectual Discourse in Syria During the Third Decade of the "Corrective Movement" 1988-2003.

Early life 

Reda Mansour, a Druze citizen of Israel,  studied in Haifa between 1977–1983; first in the Leo Baeck Middle School and later in Basmat High School of the Technion (Israel’s institute of science and technology). During that time he was involved in many youth organizations which develop cross-cultural understanding around the world, by encouraging respect for cultural difference. Among these organizations: CISV and BBYO - B'nai B'rith Youth Organization (chairman of local branch). In 1988-1989 he was also active in Habonim Dror (in British Columbia, Canada and Maryland, United States).

During the first years of his university studies in Haifa, Mansour was involved in a Variety of social projects among them: Perach: Coordination of student assistance to young primary school students in two villages in the Galilee, and Bridging the Gap: Promotion of Higher education in Minority communities

Literary career

Mr. Mansour is the first non-Jewish poet in Israel to write exclusively in Hebrew. His short story "Jumblat in the Negev" has won the "Recommended Story" category of the "Ha'aretz" Annual Short Story Award in 1997. In addition, a collection of his poems is currently translated to Spanish and Portuguese. He is at work on a book of short stories.

Reda Mansour has participated in poetry readings and Poetry festivals in Isfiya, Haifa, Tel Aviv, San Francisco, New York, Los Angeles, Seattle, Miami, Houston, New Mexico, San Salvador, Quito and Lisbon.

Mansour participated in the Charleston's historic Piccolo Spoleto festival in June 2008. He held a reading of some of his acclaimed poetic works at Charleston's City Gallery at historic Waterfront Park.

Tender Leaves of Conscience

This collection of Hebrew poems was written in various places around the world starting from 1998 during the author's studies in the KSG and ending in Portugal four years later. The poems are dedicated to nature and its effect on history and people. They blend together Arab and Jewish traditions and the multiethnic history of the Iberian Peninsula with some images of the modern American literature. They explore the relationships between people and places.  The title of the book is the title of one of the poems that was written during a Cambridge spring mixing with the news of the massacres in the Balkans. Published by Sa'ar Publishing 2004, Cover design by Israeli renowned photographer Alex Levac.

Other books by the author

The Man of Dreams (1987)
From the Battlefields to the Land of Freedom (1991)
 UN Peacekeeping Forces (Ed) (1991)
 UN Security Council Resolution on the Middle East (Ed)(1993)
 The Silence Between the words (2008)English Translations

Diplomacy

Appointed at 35 years old, Mr. Mansour was the youngest Ambassador in Israel’s History. During his career in the Foreign Service, Mr. Mansour served as Ambassador of Israel to Ecuador.  Prior to that, he served as DCM in the Israeli Embassy in Portugal and as Consul in the Israeli Consulate in San Francisco. Mr. Mansour speaks five languages.

He served as the Consul General in the Israeli Consulate in Atlanta. In January, 2007, the Georgia Senate passed a resolution honoring Mansour and others for efforts to promote peace and grow business, cultural and educational ties between the U.S. and Israel. He was the Israeli Ambassador to Brazil between 2014 and 2016, and has been the Israeli Ambassador to Panama since 2018 and concurrently serving to Barbados, Trinidad and Tobago and CARICOM.

Civic activities

Mr. Mansour has devoted his public activities in Israel for the promotion of dialogue between Arabs and Jews. In this realm, he has served on the board of several NGO's and taken part in many projects aimed at promoting of co-existence and cultural dialogue.

Mansour served on the board of many civic organizations:

Jewish Healthcare International - Provide Humanitarian Aid Worldwide. International Organizations, Member of the board, Atlanta – Georgia.

The U.S – Israel Chamber of commerce - Non Governmental Organization. Member of the board. Atlanta - Georgia.

Georgia International Law Enforcement Exchange - Non Governmental Organization Member of the board, Atlanta – Georgia.

Ecuador – Israel cultural Institute - Civic Association, Member of the board. Quito – Ecuador.

The Shalom (Peace) Club - Civic Association, Member of the board. Quito – Ecuador.

Omanut Laam - for the promotion of culture and art in small communities. Non Governmental Organization, Member of the board, Israel.

San Francisco Amuta - support to educational activities in the North of Israel. Non Governmental Organization, Member of the board. Israel.

Morehouse College - Member of the Martin Luther King Jr. international Board of sponsors - Atlanta

Reda Mansour courted moderate Muslim leaders in Europe to counteract the sway of Islamists hostile to the state of Israel (2005–2006). Mansour aimed at finding the silent voice—to give it a means of speaking out so that it will condemn terror, condemn anti-Semitism, and connect with the local Jewish communities for the sake of joint civil actions.

Awards, prizes, and fellowships

Haaretz Annual Prize, recommended short story.
 Hero of International Trade, World Chambers of Commerce – Atlanta
 MLK board of advisers, Morehouse College, Atlanta
 Miller Prize of Haifa University, for the poetry book Images of a Bridge
 Amos Prize of the president of Israel to writers.
 Dean Achievement List - University of Haifa
 The Wexner Foundation – Wexner Israel Fellow – Harvard University
 Georgia Senate Resolution - Honored for efforts to promote peace and grow business, cultural and educational ties between the U.S. and Israel
 Honorary Tennessean – By Governor Phil Bredesen

Humanitarian aid and peace-building operations

Tungurahua relief

The volcano erupted in 2002 and a major ash out-fall covered the entire region including the capital city. Ambassador Mansour organized a relief effort that included the delivery of medical equipment and aid to small communities.

Stabilization of the Ecuadorian north border

Following the establishment of ODENOR the Ecuadorian Authority for stabilization of the border areas with Colombia (2003), Ambassador Mansour facilitated the participation of Israel in the International donor countries conference in Brussels. Later he led two projects in that region that provided clean drinking water.

Battling Desertification in southern Ecuador

As part of the efforts to battle desertification in southern Ecuador and foster the Ecuador – Peru peace agreement, Ambassador Mansour invited Israeli scientists to this region. The scientists from the Ben-Gurion University in the Negev offered assessment and evaluated possible remedies. The university also invited Ecuadorian students to study in its International School for Desert Studies

Articles by the author  
 Israel sets an example of freedom, tolerance
 The Lebanon-Israel tragedy and Hope
  Integration Is Israeli Arabs’ Only Path To Equality
Israel wants peace, political moderation
Gaza: A 40-Year Struggle to Maintain Hope
Green: taking humanity to the next level

Poems 

 Carmel (English)
 I Am The Man of Dreams 
 Nomads (Spanish)

External links
 The Meacham Workshop
 Modern Hebrew Literature - a Bio-Bibliographical Lexicon
Support Cross-Cultural Dialogue
Presentation on the Middle East – Video
The world adores us
Israel is seeking Muslim friends in Europe
Israeli Ambassador to Lecture on Middle East Peace and Reconciliation

1965 births
Harvard Kennedy School alumni
University of Haifa alumni
University of Salamanca alumni
Hebrew University of Jerusalem alumni
Israeli male poets
Arab citizens of Israel
Israeli Druze
Israeli Arabic-language poets
Living people
People from Isfiya
Ambassadors of Israel to Ecuador
Ambassadors of Israel to Brazil
Ambassadors of Israel to Panama
Ambassadors of Israel to Barbados
Israeli consuls
Ambassadors of Israel to Trinidad and Tobago